Artprice is a French online art price database created in 1987 by its now CEO Thierry Ehrmann

Foundation and development 
Created in 1987 by Thierry Ehrmann, Artprice is a subsidiary company of the Server Group (Groupe Serveur in French). Its website aims to list all artwork from the 17th century to contemporary pieces.

In 2004, Artprice launched a fixed price marketplace for artwork that later led to the creation of an online auction service.

In 2010, Christie's arts auction house sued Artprice for copyright violation of its digital catalog, claiming 63 million euros in commercial prejudice.

In 2014, Artprice redesigned its website and mobile applications and launched a premium fixed price marketplace service.

In February 2015, Artprice executives announced they were seriously considering a merger between an American auction house and their own American subsidiary, Artmarket.com. Later that same year, Artprice denied rumors about their intention to acquire Artnet.com.

Activities 
Artprice now claims to be the world leading online art price database, with more than 27 million entries commented by its art historians, covering as much as 500 000 artists.

Artprice Images allows unlimited access to the one of the most important worldwide collection of artworks, counting over 108 million images constantly updated from various auction houses. The company continuously publishes trends in relation to the art market for major art agencies as well as 6 300 newspapers worldwide through its press agency, Art Market Insight.

Artprice now counts over 2 million registered users and is traded on NYSE Euronext.

External links 
 The Server Group website

Companies listed on Euronext Paris
French auction houses
Companies based in Auvergne-Rhône-Alpes